James Wakefield Tate (10 May 1912 – 4 March 1984) was an Australian rules footballer who played with North Melbourne in the Victorian Football League (VFL).

Notes

External links 

1912 births
1984 deaths
Australian rules footballers from Melbourne
North Melbourne Football Club players
People from Essendon, Victoria